is the 57th single by Japanese idol group AKB48. It was released in Japan by King Records on March 18, 2020, in four versions. It debuted at number one on the Oricon Singles Chart and Billboard Japan Hot 100, with over 1.4 million copies sold in its first week, making them the first girl group to surpass one million copies in its first week that year. The center for the main track is Mizuki Yamauchi. This single also serves as the last single and senbatsu for long time member Minami Minegishi.

Commercial performance 
"Shitsuren, Arigatō" is the 44th consecutive single by AKB48 to debut at number one. It is their first and only single of 2020.

Track listing

Contributing Members

Shitsuren, Arigatō 
Performed by Senbatsu, Mizuki Yamauchi Center
 Team A: Mion Mukaichi, Yui Yokoyama
 Team K: Minami Minegishi, Tomu Muto
 Team B: Seina Fukuoka, Yuki Kashiwagi, Satone Kubo
 Team 4: Yuiri Murayama, Nana Okada, Mizuki Yamauchi
 Team 8: Rin Okabe, Yui Oguri
 SKE48 Team E: Akari Suda
 NMB48 Team N: Akari Yoshida
 NMB48 Team M: Miru Shiroma
 HKT48 Team H: Miku Tanaka
 NGT48 1st Generation: Hinata Homma
 STU48 STU: Yumiko Takino

Mata Aeru Hi Made 
Minami Minegishi graduation song, Minami Minegishi center
 Team A: Ayana Shinozaki, Mion Mukaichi
 Team K: Haruka Komiyama, Minami Minegishi, Shinobu Mogi
 Team B: Saho Iwatate, Saki Kitazawa
 Team 4: Nana Okada, Yuiri Murayama

Omoide, My Friend 
Credited as 1st Campus, Maho Omori center
 Team A: Manaka Taguchi, Erii Chiba, Rei Nishikawa
 Team B: Maho Omori
 Team 4: Nanami Asai
 Team 8: Yuka Suzuki
 SKE48 Team E: Haruka Kumazaki, Oka Suenaga
 NMB48 Team BII: Cocona Umeyama, Ayaka Yamamoto
 HKT48 Team KIV: Hirona Unjo
 HKT48 Team TII: Hana Matsuoka
 NGT48 1st Generation: Tsugumi Oguma
 NGT48 Kenkyuusei: Chikana Ando
 STU48 STU: Chiho Ishida, Fu Yabushita

Jitabata 
Team 8 (11 Members) Yui Oguri center
 Team 8: Rin Okabe, Yui Oguri, Momoka Onishi, Erina Oda, Misaki Kawahara, Yurina Gyoten, Narumi Kuranoo, Nagisa Sakaguchi, Miu Shitao, Serika Nagano, Nanase Yoshikawa

Aisuru Hito 
20 members, Nana Okada center
 Team A: Mion Mukaichi, Yui Yokoyama
 Team K: Tomu Muto
 Team B: Maho Omori, Yuki Kashiwagi, Satone Kubo
 Team 4: Nana Okada, Yuiri Murayama, Mizuki Yamauchi
 Team 8: Rin Okabe, Yui Oguri, Narumi Kuranoo, Nagisa Sakaguchi
 SKE48 Team E: Akari Suda
 NMB48 Team N: Akari Yoshida
 NMB48 Team M: Miru Shiroma
 HKT48 Team H: Miku Tanaka
 NGT48 1st Generation: Hinata Homma
 STU48 STU: Chiho Ishida, Yumiko Takino

Charts

References 

2020 singles
2020 songs
AKB48 songs
Oricon Weekly number-one singles
Billboard Japan Hot 100 number-one singles